Nicholas John Simper (born 3 November 1945) is an English bass guitarist, who was a co-founding member of Deep Purple and Warhorse. In the 1960s, he began his professional career in bands such as Johnny Kidd & the Pirates, The Flower Pot Men, and Lord Sutch's Savages.

Biography
Simper was born in Frogmore House Maternity Home, Norwood Green, Southall, Middlesex. Prior to co-founding Deep Purple in 1968, Simper played for a number of bands, including The Renegades (1960–61), The Delta Five (1961–63), Some Other Guys (1963–64), Buddy Britten & The Regents renamed Simon Raven Cult (1964–66) and Johnny Kidd & the Pirates. After a few months of his joining The Pirates, Simper and Kidd were involved in a car crash that took Kidd's life and left Simper injured. After recovering, Simper briefly reactivated The Pirates as a tribute band to Kidd (1966–67) before joining the Garden, the backing band for The Flower Pot Men (1967–68), where he played alongside Jon Lord who initially suggested that Simper be asked to join Deep Purple. Simper also had a brief encounter with Lord Sutch's Savages.

Simper played bass on three Deep Purple albums from 1968 to 1969. He was fired from Deep Purple in mid-1969 together with original singer Rod Evans. When new singer Ian Gillan from the band Episode Six was sought as a replacement for Evans, bandmate Roger Glover tagged along to play bass at some rehearsals and recorded the single "Hallelujah" for Deep Purple. Ritchie Blackmore had also appeared in interviews during disputes with Simper.

After his departure, he briefly worked with Marsha Hunt before forming his own band Warhorse, that recorded two albums for Vertigo. Warhorse was managed by Ron Hire, originally part of HEC Enterprises, the original investors in Deep Purple. During this time, Simper also played on a Lord Sutch live album, along with Ritchie Blackmore and Keith Moon.

For Warhorse, the breakthrough of a big selling album had not occurred. There was very strong interest from Warner Bros., with their senior A&R rep (Dave Dee) attempting to sign the band to the label. At Warner Bros. expense, they went into the studio and recorded two tracks, competing with Heavy Metal Kids.

By 1974, crippling finances signalled the end for the band. Warhorse's last gig in late 1974 was at Polhill College, Bedford. Unfortunately, their 2000-Watt Midas P.A. broke down and despite the best efforts of their roadie and managers it could not be made to perform properly. They tried, and performed a B.B. King song (Three O'clock in the Morning) to see if they could manage some kind of performance, but made their apologies to the audience and left.

Simper and guitarist Pete Parks spent the next three years writing, recording and initially formed a new band, called Nick Simper's Dynamite (1975) that released one single.

On 9 October 1976, Simper took part in the Johnny Kidd 10th Anniversary Memorial Show at the Edwardian Club at the Loughborough Hotel in Brixton.

With no financial backing, along with Parks, Simper succeeded to get Nick Simper's Fandango (1977–83) off the ground and released two albums. Around the same time, Frankie Reid formed the band Flying Fox (1977–84) with Carlo Little, Simper and Parks to play rock 'n' roll whenever they were free from commitments from their other bands.

After Little's departure the band renamed itself The Good Old Boys (1985–present). In the mid-1990s, drummer Mick Underwood invited Simper to become part of the reactivated Quatermass, which had released one album on Harvest in 1970. Under the guise of Quatermass II (1994–97) they recorded one album.

In 2007, Simper also joined the line-up of Adelle & Co with Parks, Adelle Kirk, Jim Byers and Richard Hudson.

Since launching his own website in the 2000s, Simper has renewed his contact with a wider audience. The renaissance of his work has led to a one-off reunion of Warhorse in 2003 (and also 2005). During a gig in Austria in 2007, Simper performed the Deep Purple song "Emmaretta" with the support band Nasty Habits. On 6 September 2008, The Good Ol' Boys stepped in towards the end to support Deep Purple tribute band 24 Carat Purple at the Mick Jagger Centre, Dartford. Simper played "Hush" as a guest with this band, using bassist Pete Hartley's bass guitar. In March 2009, Simper again performed with Nasty Habits in Austria. The band played a setlist composed of songs from the first three Deep Purple studio albums. Later that year, Nick Simper & Nasty Habits played another show in Plock, Poland.

In 2010, Simper and Nasty Habits played more shows presenting "The Deep Purple Mark One Songbook" in Austria, Switzerland, Hungary and Poland while an album was in the making. The Budapest show was recorded for future release.

Rock and Roll Hall of Fame snub
In 2016, Deep Purple was inducted into the Rock and Roll Hall of Fame. All members from the band's first seven years (1968 to 1974) were announced as individual inductees, except Simper, but including original lead singer Rod Evans whose tenure in Deep Purple paralleled Simper's. Evans had also been successfully sued by Deep Purple's management in 1980 for performing an unauthorized tour under the band name; Simper had been approached by the same promotion company that had hired Evans, but declined to participate.

Simper stated, "Yes, it is a little strange that I am [the] only one from Marks I, II and III being left out, but I shan't lose any sleep over this. It's not as if I need to be given this award to know what we did in Deep Purple made an impact. And I'm sure it wasn't a decision that came from the band."

Discography

Guest appearances
1972 Hands of Jack the Ripper (Screaming Lord Sutch & Heavy Friends)
1983 Roscoe Rocks Again (Roscoe Gordon)
2003 Rag Moppin''' (Wee Willie Harris & the Alabama Slammers)
2007 Carlo Little Night of Honour (DVD)
2008 White Horses of Lyme Bay (CD EP)
2009 Never Stop Rockin''' (Carlo Little All Stars)

References

External links

Official site
MySpace
Nick Simper profile at deep-purple.net
Nick Simper interview on Rockpages.gr

1945 births
English rock bass guitarists
Male bass guitarists
English heavy metal bass guitarists
Living people
People from Ealing
Deep Purple members
English male singers
English songwriters
Screaming Lord Sutch and the Savages members
Johnny Kidd & the Pirates members
The Flower Pot Men members
Warhorse (British band) members
Quatermass (band) members